Duri may refer to:
 Duri, New South Wales, Australia
 Duri, Riau, a town in the Riau province on Sumatra, Indonesia
 Duri language, an Austronesian language of Sulawesi
 Duri (name), Korean unisex given name (including a list of people with the name)
 Düri, village in the Tibet Autonomous Region in China.

See also
 Duris (disambiguation)